Hejnice may refer to places in the Czech Republic:

Hejnice (Liberec District), a town in the Liberec Region
Hejnice (Ústí nad Orlicí District), a municipality and village in the Pardubice Region